Dearly Precious (1973–1992) was an American Champion Thoroughbred racehorse.

Background
Bred in Florida by Mrs. Jean R. Pancoast, she was out of the mare Imsodear and sired by U.S. Racing Hall of Fame inductee Dr. Fager. Richard E. Bailey, a  cable television executive,  purchased her as a yearling for $22,000 and entrusted her race conditioning to Stephen A. DiMauro.

Racing career
On the way to being voted the Eclipse Award as 1975's American Champion Two-Year-Old Filly, Dearly Precious won eight of her nine starts. Her wins included important races for her age group under regular jockey Michael Hole, such the Arlington-Washington Lassie Stakes, Astoria Stakes, and the Spinaway Stakes. As a three-year-old, Dearly Precious won her April 4, 1976 debut in the Flirtation Stakes at Baltimore's Pimlico Race Course. On April 25, she won her tenth straight race, capturing the Prioress Stakes at Aqueduct Racetrack. On May 5, Dearly Precious lost by half a length to Tell Me All in the Comely Handicap, then on May 14 she was beaten by a nose in the Black-Eyed Susan Stakes, handicapped by ten more pounds than the winner, What A Summer. On May 22, she came back to win the first leg of the Filly Triple Crown, the Acorn Stakes.

Injury and retirement
Rested after her tough win over Optimistic Gal in the Acorn Stakes, Dearly Precious was in the hunt for another annual Championship when she suffered a bowed tendon in her left foreleg on July 11, 1976 while winning the Dark Mirage Stakes at Aqueduct Racetrack. Her racing career over, Dearly Precious retired having won twelve of her sixteen starts, and eventually served as a broodmare. Her offspring met with limited success in racing, the best of which was a mating to Nijinsky that produced stakes winner Mister Modesty.

Pedigree

References

 Dearly Precious' pedigree and partial racing stats
 April 27, 1976 New York Times article titled Dearly Precious Wins 10th in Row
 July 12, 1976 New York Times article titled Star Filly Is Injured At Aqueduct; Dearly Precious Injured

1973 racehorse births
1992 racehorse deaths
Thoroughbred family 11
Racehorses bred in Florida
Racehorses trained in the United States
Eclipse Award winners